Abram Sharpless Valentine (July 11, 1871 – July 29, 1921) was an early professional football player for the Allegheny Athletic Association. He served as the team's quarterback in 1890 and 1891. However, he jumped to the rival Pittsburgh Athletic Club in 1892. Valentine played for Pittsburgh in their first two games. Then, without warning, he suddenly jumped back to the Allegheny team. Some Pittsburgh A.C. members accused Allegheny of enticing him back, while others charged he had all along been a spy for them. During Allegheny's two games against the Pittsburgh A.C. that year, Valentine played as a left halfback.

In 1891, he played in a game for Shadyside Academy as that team was defeated by the Pittsburgh A.C., 26–0. That same year, he scored a touchdown against the Greensburg Athletic Association, during a 10–0 Allegheny win. During a game against the Detroit Athletic Club on November 11, 1893, Valentine reportedly openly punched Detroit's quarterback openly. The officials ignored the incident, and the Detroiter used the next play to retaliate against Valentine. Shortly after, a brawl between the two clubs erupted. Allegheny would go on to win the game 18–0. In 1894, during a game against the Pittsburgh A.C., Valentine was thrown out of the game after coming to the aid of James Van Cleve during a fight against Pittsburgh's Joe Trees. After several appeals, Valentine left the field reportedly "crying like a boy" according to the Pittsburgh Post.

In 1895, Allegheny declined to field a team after learning of an investigation into the club by the Amateur Athletic Union, over reports that the team had been secretly paying players. As a result, Valentine became a referee. He officiated a game that year between the Duquesne Country and Athletic Club and Greensburg. The game was filled with fights and arguments. Valentine refused to return to the game for the second half.

References

Players of American football from Pennsylvania
Allegheny Athletic Association players
Penn Quakers football players
Pittsburgh Athletic Club (football) players
American football officials
Year of birth missing
Year of death missing
19th-century players of American football